The Point may refer to:

Buildings and venues 
 The Point, Cardiff, a church-turned-music venue in Wales
 The Point Theatre, Dublin, former name of 3Arena, an indoor amphitheatre
 The Point, Eastleigh, a theatre and dance studios, Eastleigh, Hampshire, England
 The Point, Milton Keynes, an entertainment complex in Milton Keynes, Buckinghamshire, England
 The Point, Panama City, an all-residential building in Panama City, Panama
 Point State Park, at the confluence of Allegheny and Monongahela rivers in Pittsburgh, Pennsylvania, called The Point by natives
 The Point, a conference facility and landmark at Old Trafford Cricket Ground, Manchester, England
 United States Military Academy, known as "The Point" because it is near West Point, New York

Places
 Covington, Kentucky, originally known as The Point
 The Point, Louisville, a neighborhood in Louisville, Kentucky
 The Point or Easton's Point, a historical neighborhood in Newport, Rhode Island

Radio 
 WCYT (91.1 FM The Point), a nonprofit educational station that plays alternative and indie music in Fort Wayne, Indiana
 KKPT (94.1 FM The Point), a classic-rock radio station in Little Rock, Arkansas
 WJLK (94.3 FM The Point), an adult top-40 radio station in Asbury Park, New Jersey
 WKBE (100.3 FM The Point), an alternative radio station in Warrensburg, New York
 WPOI (101.5 FM The Point), a radio station that plays 1980s, 1990s, and late 1970s music
 KPNT (105.7 FM The Point), an alternative-rock radio station in St. Louis, Missouri
 KHPT (106.9 FM The Point), a radio station that plays "the Best of the 80's and more" in Conroe, Texas
 The Point (radio network), a network of radio stations in Vermont
 The Point (radio show), a Canadian radio program which aired in 2008 and 2009

Other uses
 The Point (film), a 2006 film
 The Point!, a 1971 animated film, album, and musical by Harry Nilsson
 The Point (magazine), an American literary magazine
 The Point (the Gambia), a newspaper published in the Gambia
 The point (ice hockey), a position in ice hockey
 The Point, a band featuring Nicke Andersson and Neil Leyton
 Public Oregon Intercity Transit, styled The POINT, a public transit system
 The POINT Community Development Corporation, an organization in the South Bronx
 The Point, precursor company to Groupon
 The Point with Mark Hyman, an editorial series by commentator Mark Hyman

See also
 Point (disambiguation)